Wireless: The Essential Charles Stross is an English language collection of science fiction short stories by Charles Stross published by Orbit Books.

Contents
“Missile Gap” (One Million A.D., 2005, edited by Gardner Dozois)
“Rogue Farm” (Live Without a Net, 2003, edited by Lou Anders)
“A Colder War” (Spectrum SF 3, 2000) available online
“MAXOS” (Nature, 2005)
“Down on the Farm” (Tor.com, 2008) available online
“Unwirer” with Cory Doctorow (ReVisions, 2004 edited by Julie E. Czerneda and Isaac Szpindel)
“Snowball's Chance” (Nova Scotia: New Scottish Speculative Fiction, 2005, edited by Neil Williamson and Andrew J. Wilson)
“Trunk and Disorderly” (Asimov's Science Fiction, 2007)
“Palimpsest”; winner of the 2010 Hugo Award for Best Novella

References

Science fiction short story collections
British short story collections
2009 short story collections
Orbit Books books